The M25 Consortium of Academic Libraries is a collaborative organisation that works to improve library and information services within the M25 region, and more widely across the East and Southeast of England.

The Consortium has registered charity status, awarded by the Charity Commission of England and Wales in January 2009.

Structure
Since its formation in 1993, with 29 members, the Consortium has continued to expand both its activities and its member base. In 2002, membership was opened up to non-higher education organisations; M25 now currently represents 55 institutions as of 2016. 

The Consortium provides a forum for sharing expertise and good practice; it is committed to collaboration as a way of building relationships around libraries, users and collections to bring added value to services. Whilst its direct customers are member libraries, indirect customers include students, academics, and researchers of member institutions (and beyond).

Acting as a single voice for its diverse membership, the Consortium has aimed to represent the interests of academic and research libraries at both regional and national level. It has built working relationships with several information service organisations, including:
Research Libraries UK, formerly CURL
Jisc
SCONUL

The Consortium's technical and administrative support team is based at the British Library of Political and Economic Science, London School of Economics, 10 Portugal Street, London. WC2A 2HD.

Projects and services
The Consortium's work has facilitated a range of services and resources for the benefit of learners and researchers.
The M25 Web Guide to M25 libraries was launched in 1996, winning a UCISA award in 1997. M25 LINK, launched in 1998, aimed to provide single search access to the OPACs of a subset of six members of the M25 Consortium of Higher Education Libraries.
M25 Web Guide and M25 Link were replaced in 2001 by the Inform25 suite of services, still in operation: Find a Library enables users to find information about member libraries; the Search Catalogue service allows users to simultaneously search across forty catalogues, with online help and a clear user interface; the Union List of Serials holds data on periodicals in the libraries of the University of London and University of Westminster.
M25 Access Scheme. Launched in its original form in 1997, this project was influential in the creation of Sconul's 'Research Extra' scheme – a co-operative venture enabling  researchers from participating institutions to visit any other participating library and register as an external borrower; Research Extra (and UK Libraries Plus) were then superseded by 'Sconul Access' in 2006. Today the M25 Access Scheme enables library users from those libraries that are not eligible to participate in Sconul Access (i.e. non-HE) to use the services of HE libraries within the Consortium.
In 2003 cpd25 was launched. Five cpd25 Task Groups, each focusing on different areas of library and information service provision – from legal compliance to building management – devise a yearly programme of Continuing Professional Development events. Training is tailored for library staff, at all stages in their careers, and is open to staff in both member institutions and external libraries.  In 2007, cpd25 was awarded CILIP's training and development Seal of Recognition.
The Consortium has undertaken valuable work in the area of Disaster Planning, the most widely known product of which being the freely available Disaster Control Plan Template, first created in 1997. In addition, since 1999, all Consortium members are signatories to a reciprocal Mutual Support Agreement, under which members will, in the event of a disaster at another institution, endeavour to provide physical access, study spaces, and services to the affected library's users.
The Consortium has produced a Service Level Definition Template which can be used either as an internal document for library use only or as an external document to express service levels to stakeholders.

Current and future
M25 continues to grow and forge additional partnerships with library sector organisations. On an ongoing basis the Consortium reviews and looks to improve services offered to users; currently it is looking into ways to encourage member libraries to allow walk-in visitor access to electronic resources.

Member institutions

Footnotes

References
Cox-De Souza, G (2008). "Celebrating 15 years of library collaboration", Sconul Focus, 43, Spring 2008.
Sykes, J (1998). "M25 Link", Ariadne, (13), Jan 1998.
Enright, S (2002). "Update on M25 Consortium – what's new in London?", Sconul Newsletter, 25, Spring 2002.
Hall, J (2003). "Sconul Research Extra", Sconul Newsletter, 28, Spring 2003
Hall, J (2007). "Sconul Access", Sconul Focus, 40, Spring 2007.
Wise, C (2006). "Thinking the unthinkable: disaster planning for the M25 Consortium of Academic Libraries", Sconul Focus, 38, Summer/Autumn 2006.

External links
 M25 Consortium of Academic Libraries
 cpd25
 inform25
 Charity Commission of England and Wales

Organizations established in 1993
M25 Consortium of Academic Libraries
Charities based in London
Consortia in the United Kingdom
1993 establishments in England
Library consortia